Edrenikovo is a village in the municipality of Vasilevo, North Macedonia.

Demographics
According to the 2002 census, the village had a total of 225 inhabitants. Ethnic groups in the village include:

Macedonians 224
Others 1

References

Villages in Vasilevo Municipality